Phyllonorycter hapalotoxa is a moth of the family Gracillariidae. It is found in Assam and Meghalaya, India.

The larvae feed on Malus domestica, Malus pumila and Malus sylvestris. They probably mine the leaves of their host plant.

References

hapalotoxa
Moths of Asia
Moths described in 1921